Felix Petermann (born April 11, 1984) is a German professional ice hockey defenceman. He is currently an unrestricted free agent who last played as captain for EHC München in the Deutsche Eishockey Liga (DEL).

Career statistics

References

External links

1984 births
Living people
Adler Mannheim players
EHC München players
EV Füssen players
German ice hockey defencemen
Thomas Sabo Ice Tigers players
Sportspeople from Füssen